Events from the year 1915 in Mexico.

Incumbents

Federal government
President: Venustiano Carranza
Secretary of the Interior: Adolfo de la Huerta

Governors
 Aguascalientes: Aurelio L. González
 Campeche: Joaquín Mucel Acereto
 Chiapas: Manuel Fuentes A./Pablo Villanueva
 Chihuahua: Ignacio C. Enríquez
 Coahuila: 
 Colima: Interim Governors
 Durango:  
 Guanajuato: Agustín Alcocer
 Hidalgo: 
 Jalisco: Manuel M. Diéguez/Tomás López Linares
 Michoacán: 
 Morelos: Genovevo de la O/Lorenzo Vázquez
 Nuevo León: Ildefonso V. Vázquez/Diódoro de la Garza
 Oaxaca: 
 Puebla: 
 Querétaro: Teodoro Elizondo/Federico Montes/Gustavo M. Bravo/José Siurob Ramírez
 San Luis Potosí: Juan G. Barragán Rodríguez 
 Sinaloa: Ramón F. Iturbe
 Sonora: José María Maytorena/Plutarco Elías Calles
 Tabasco: Joaquín Ruiz/Luis Hernández Hermosillo
 Tamaulipas: Alfredo Ricaut
 Tlaxcala:  
 Veracruz: 
 Yucatán: Salvador Alvarado Rubio
 Zacatecas:

Events
January 22 – Guadalajara train disaster
April 13 – Battle of Celaya
August 8 – Norias Ranch Raid
October 21 – Ojo de Agua Raid
November 1 – Second Battle of Agua Prieta
November 26 – Battle of Nogales (1915)

Births
February 9 – Octavio Sentíes Gómez, 81, politician (PRI), Governor of Veracruz, Secretary of the Interior, Regent of DF (d. May 24, 1996].
April 4 — Guadalupe Borja de Diaz, First Lady of Mexico (1964-1970) (d. 1974)
April 21 — Anthony Quinn, Mexican-American actor, painter, writer, and film director (d. 2001)
April 24 — Salvador Borrego, non-Nazi journalist and writer (d. 2018)

Deaths

 July 2 – Porfirio Díaz, 29th President of Mexico (died in France) (b. 1830)

See also
Mexican Revolution

References

 
Years of the 20th century in Mexico
Mexico